"Roar" is a song by American singer Katy Perry for her fourth studio album, Prism (2013). It was released as the lead single from the record on August 10, 2013. Perry co-wrote the song with Bonnie McKee and its producers Dr. Luke, Max Martin, and Cirkut. It is a power pop song containing elements of arena rock and lyrics centering on standing up for oneself and self-empowerment.

To promote the song, Perry performed under the Brooklyn Bridge at the end of the 2013 MTV Video Music Awards, on The X Factor Australia, at the Sydney Opera House in late October 2013, and on the German TV show Schlag den Raab. Grady Hall and Mark Kudsi directed the song's music video, which features Perry trying to adapt to the jungle and taming a tiger after surviving a plane crash. The song was nominated for Song of the Year and Best Pop Solo Performance at the 56th Annual Grammy Awards.

The song was a commercial success, topping charts in Australia, Austria, Canada, Ireland, Israel, Lebanon, New Zealand, Scotland, Slovenia, South Korea, the United Kingdom, and the United States. By the end of 2013, "Roar" had sold over 9.9 million units (combined sales and track-equivalent streams) globally according to the International Federation of the Phonographic Industry (IFPI). "Roar" has sold 6.6 million copies in the US, over 1 million in the United Kingdom, and was Australia's best-selling female song of the year with 560,000 copies sold within that time. When "Roar" was certified Diamond by the Recording Industry Association of America (RIAA), Perry became the first artist to have three Diamond certified singles in the country, the others being "Firework" and "Dark Horse". In February 2020, the music video for "Roar" reached 3 billion views, becoming the first female-centered video to reach the milestone in YouTube's history.

Production and composition

The song was mixed by Serban Ghenea at MixStar Studios. "Roar" was recorded in four other studios: Luke's in the Boo, Playback Recording Studio and Secret Garden Studios, all located in the state of California, as well as MXM Studios in Stockholm, Sweden. Perry co-wrote the song with Bonnie McKee and its producers Dr. Luke, Max Martin, and Cirkut. All its development took place in March 2013. McKee told MTV that "Roar" is "kind of a 'pick yourself up and dust yourself off and keep going', female-empowerment song" and "kind of an epiphany song." Perry said she wrote the song after undergoing therapy, saying she was "sick of keeping all these feelings inside and not speaking up for myself".

Musically, "Roar" is a power pop song that features elements of arena rock. Throughout the song, Perry "flexes diva-like vocals", singing the lyric "Hey!" several times in a way resemblant of The Lumineers. The song's instrumentation is composed of "pounding" pianos and "booming" bass drums. According to the sheet music published by Alfred Music. on Musicnotes.com, "Roar" is composed in the key of B major and set in a  time signature at a moderate tempo of 90 beats per minute. Perry's vocal range spans from the low note B3 to the high note E5, while the music follows the chord progression of B–Cm–Gm–E. The song shares the theme of empowerment with Perry's single "Firework". Perry described the track as a song speaking about standing up for oneself.

Release
Perry announced "Roar" would be the first single from Prism with the release of a video teaser featuring the singer burning a blue wig. More video teasers were released onto YouTube, showing Perry at a funeral with a coffin decorated with the singer's famous pink and white pinwheels dress, and entering a recording booth while dressed with a "throwback" jacket featured in the single's cover art, which was revealed on August 8, 2013. It features a tiger print border around Perry, who wears a blue Japanese silk sukajan jacket, with the image of a tiger printed on its back. On the same day of the song's digital release, a lyric video for it, produced by Joe Humpay, Aya Tanimura, Tim Zimmer, and Tuan Le, was released onto YouTube. It primarily shows Perry doing daily activities such as eating breakfast, going to the bathroom, and taking a bath, while texting the lyrics of "Roar" to friends. Some words are substituted with various Emoji characters. It was target of plagiarism accusations by music producer Dillon Francis, who felt it copied the concept of instant messaging from his video entitled "Messages".

The first video teaser for "Roar" was released on August 2, 2013, along with an announcement that the American release was scheduled for August 12 with a subsequent release to mainstream radio on August 13. However, the song debuted two days earlier than expected by leaking on August 10. The UK release was originally scheduled for September 8, but on August 30 Perry announced the release date would be moved up to September 1.

Critical reception

Miriam Coleman from Rolling Stone appreciated the songs's "easy poppy beat" and its "repeated refrains", factors she believed contributed to make the song a "determined note for the new album". James Montgomery of MTV described it as "one of the more perfect pop songs to come down the pipeline in quite a while". Gerrick D. Kennedy from Los Angeles Times also gave a positive review, classifying "Roar" as a "sweet, poppy confection with a bit of bite". Melinda Newman from HitFix saw the song as a "change of pace" for Perry, whilst Andrew Hampp from Billboard believed it to be a return to the style of her album One of the Boys, but criticized its tempo and its lyrics that "rarely rise above easy clichés and rhymes". Sal Cinquemani from Slant Magazine described the song as "more of a yelp than a roar".

Plagiarism allegations
Upon the release of "Roar", many accused Perry of copying Sara Bareilles's "Brave". When Bareilles herself was asked about the controversy between the two songs, she responded: "Katy's a friend of mine and we've known each other a really long time", and was upset that there was a "negative spin on two artists that are choosing to share positive messages." She also mentioned she had known about "Roar" before its release and stated "If I'm not mad I don't know why anybody else is upset". In response to the accusations, Dr. Luke tweeted on August 14, 2013: "Roar was written and recorded before Brave came out." In direct response to the attention "Brave" received as a result of the plagiarism accusations, Bareilles's record label, Epic Records, decided to promote "Brave" to the mainstream pop radio format.

Commercial performance

North America
On the Billboard Hot 100, the song debuted at number 85 on the week-ending August 24, 2013 due to radio airplay. The following week, during its first week on sale, "Roar" sold 557,000 digital copies, earning Perry the highest first-week sales numbers of 2013 and also her biggest digital song sales week ever, breaking her previous record held by "Firework", which sold 509,000 digital copies for the week ending January 8, 2011. The song soared eighty-three positions to number two in its second week, becoming Perry's twelfth top-ten entry in the United States, and her ninth consecutive single to reach the top three on the Hot 100. After another week at number two, "Roar" reached number one for the chart dated September 4, 2013, becoming Perry's eighth number one on the Hot 100 and her ninth digital number-one single, after selling 448,000 copies. "Roar" spent a total two weeks at number one before it was surpassed by Miley Cyrus's "Wrecking Ball". On its seventh frame, the song moved 2-1 (peak audience impressions of 159 million) and became Perry's sixth number one on the Billboard Hot 100 Airplay, as well as becoming her fastest climb to the top position.

"Roar" also reached number one on both the US Mainstream Top 40 and Adult Pop Songs. The number-one position on the Pop Songs chart gave Perry her tenth number one, tying her with Rihanna for the most number ones on the airplay-based chart. The number-one position on the Adult Pop Songs chart also gave Perry multiple milestones; it became her eighth chart topper, tying her with Maroon 5 and Pink as the act with the most number-ones there. It also made the fastest ascension to the top spot; a record previously held by Perry's own single "California Gurls" (2010). It also set airplay records in both of the charts, by becoming the most weekly-played song in history, with 16,065 and 5,309 plays per week, respectively.

The song has also reached the top spot on both the Adult contemporary chart and Hot Dance Club Songs. In addition to this, the track also reached number one on both the On Demand and Streaming charts, with a weekly peak of 2.1 million and 12 million, respectively. "Roar" surpassed digital sales of four million in its seventeenth week, faster than any other song in digital history. Its sales reached 4.41 million by the end of 2013, becoming the sixth best-seller of the year. Perry has eight of her songs with sales more than four million, including "Firework" (7.3 million), "Roar (6.4 million), "Dark Horse" (6.3 million), "E.T." (5.9 million), "California Gurls" (5.8 million), "Hot n Cold" (5.7 million), "Teenage Dream" (4.9 million), and "I Kissed A Girl" (4.7 million), the most for any artist. The track has sold 6,600,000 copies in the US as of August 2020, and when it was certified Diamond by the Recording Industry Association of America (RIAA) in June 2017, Perry became the first artist to achieve this with 3 singles.

On August 31, 2013, "Roar" debuted at number one on the Canadian Hot 100 on the strength of digital downloads. In doing so, it became only the eleventh song to debut at number one on the chart, and it also became Perry's third number-one debut, making her the artist with most number-one debuts at the time. It also became Perry's ninth Canadian Hot 100 number one, breaking the tie she shared with Rihanna for the most chart toppers. It has so far spent five non-consecutive weeks atop the chart. "Roar" was also in the top of the Canadian Digital Chart for three non-consecutive weeks; there, it was Perry's sixth number-one single. In Mexico, it reached number one on the Monitor Latino English-language airplay chart.

Europe, Oceania and Asia
In the United Kingdom, "Roar" entered at number one on the UK Singles Chart on September 8, 2013, selling 179,500 copies in its first week and ending the prolonged number-one run of Ellie Goulding's "Burn". The song became Perry's fourth UK number-one single. The single spent two weeks atop the chart before being succeeded by "Talk Dirty" by Jason Derulo ft. 2 Chainz. The song also debuted atop the adjacent UK chart of Scotland and the Irish Singles Chart. "Roar" was the 6th best-selling song of 2013 in the United Kingdom where it became her second single after "Firework" to sell over a million copies in January 2015, thus making Katy Perry one of only 18 artists ever to achieve more than one million sales in the nation. It has sold 1,112,787 copies in the United Kingdom as of September 2017, and has been certified quadruple platinum by the British Phonographic Industry (BPI).

The song reached number four on the Italian Singles Chart, where it was eventually certified platinum by the Federation of the Italian Music Industry, for sales of over 15,000 digital copies. In Spain, the single peaked at number five on the sales chart, according to PROMUSICAE. In Austria, it became a number-one on the Ö3 Austria Top 40, while in Germany and Switzerland it reached numbers two and three, respectively. In the Belgian Ultratop 50, "Roar" peaked at number five in Flanders and number seven in Wallonia. In France the song peaked at number six. The single also reached the top five in Norway. "Roar" found placings among the top-ten of the airplay charts in Czech Republic, Hungary, and Slovakia. Within the unofficial digital charts of Greece, Luxembourg and Portugal, compiled outside of the respective countries by Billboard, "Roar" peaked at number two in both the Greece and Luxembourg charts and at number eight in the Portuguese chart.

"Roar" entered at the top of the New Zealand Singles Chart after just four days on sale, becoming Perry's ninth number-one single, second top debut and her eleventh top ten. After less than five weeks, the Recording Industry Association of New Zealand certified the single quadruple platinum, denoting sales exceeding 60,000 units. The song is listed as the 48th best-selling single of all time in New Zealand, making Perry the only singer to have the most entries, which including "California Gurls", "Firework" and "E.T.". In Australia, the song became Perry's third song to top the ARIA Singles Chart after "I Kissed a Girl" and "California Gurls". It was the country's highest performing song of the year, topping the charts for 9 weeks and selling 560,000 copies by the end of 2013. "Roar" has since been certified 11× platinum by the Australian Recording Industry Association (ARIA). "Roar" peaked at number two in the Venezuelan Pop Rock Chart. On the Gaon Chart of South Korea, it reached number one on the international chart. In Japan, the song entered the Japan Hot 100 at number seven. They reached number one in both the Media Forest airplay chart in Israel, and the Lebanese Singles Chart. Similarly, in South Africa, the song peaked at number two on the EMA airplay chart.

In Russia, on the Tophit Weekly General Airplay chart the song debuted at number 395 on August 25, 2013, and it has climbed the chart, peaking so far at number five on November 17, 2013. On the Top Hit Weekly Audience Choice chart, it peaked at number three on the issue dated October 27, 2013. According to the International Federation of the Phonographic Industry (IFPI), "Roar" sold 9.9 million units (combined sales and track-equivalent streams) globally throughout 2013 and was the fifth best-selling single of the year.

Music video
Filming of the music video for "Roar" began on August 7, 2013 and ended on August 9, 2013. The video was released on September 5, 2013, directed by Grady Hall and Mark Kudsi, and filmed at the Los Angeles County Arboretum and Botanic Garden. A 21-second teaser of the video had previously been uploaded on August 25, 2013. Nokia posted a two-minute behind the scenes video on September 4, 2013. On November 14, 2013, an extended 17-minute behind-the-scenes video was uploaded to Vevo. "Roar" music video reached 3 billion views on February 6, 2020, making Katy Perry the first female artist to reach 3 billion views on the platform.

Synopsis
At the beginning of the video, Perry and her boyfriend (played by actor and model Brian Nagel) have crashed their plane in the middle of the jungle. Perry shows signs of worry, while her boyfriend takes pictures of himself and dumps his bags on her to explore. As it turns to night, they wander through the jungle as he throws things back at her. Suddenly, he is attacked by a tiger and Perry dumps her bags and runs off screaming. She approaches a lake and is almost bitten by a crocodile when she tries to take a drink. She sits on a rock and ends up with a tarantula crawling on her. As she looks into the lake while singing the chorus, she sees a reflection of a tiger instead of herself. Behind her in the darkness there are dozens of pairs of blinking eyes, but they are revealed to be fireflies which fly around her before forming an image of a roaring tiger in the sky.

Presumably a few days later, Perry has since made friends with a monkey and uses her stiletto heel to form a spear where she is now barefoot and only wearing what is left of her outfit. She uses the spear to shoot a banana, which she gives to the monkey. In another scene, she bathes in the lake, with the help of an elephant who sprays her with water from the lake using its trunk. Perry helps a crocodile by brushing its teeth using a toothbrush she has salvaged, and tries to reach her clothes which have been taken by the elephant. At night, she holds a torch and explores a cave. Inside, she watches an animated drawing on the wall in which humans try to kill a tiger with fire; attempting to burn it as it grows stronger and shooting spears which it sends firing back towards them with its roar. The next morning, Perry emerges from the cave wearing a leopard-print bikini top, a grass skirt, and unspecified lacings on her legs. She displays a boost of confidence and holding the spear she made earlier. She stands on top of a waterfall, overlooking the jungle, and then swings across the sky on a vine.

With the help of the monkey, Perry builds a cat toy that she uses to distract the tiger who killed her boyfriend earlier in the video. The two of them roar at each other until her roar tames the tiger as it sits in front of her submissively. Afterwards, she is shown sitting on a giant grass throne, wearing a flower crown as the rest of the jungle animals sit around her, including the tiger, monkey and elephant. The tiger is shown wearing a collar that says "Kitty Purry", a reference to her real-life cat of the same name. Perry takes selfies with the monkey on her boyfriend's phone, applies lipstick made from berry juice, and gives the elephant a pedicure with paint made from berries.

She then awakens from sleeping in the plane, leading the viewer to think all the previous events have just been a dream, but walks out of the plane wreckage still in the jungle, stretching her arms and yawning with the animals sitting around her.

Reception
Upon its release, the music video received mixed reviews from critics. Idolator contributors Robbie Daw, Sam Lansky, and Carl Willott gave it mostly lackluster reviews. Daw considered that the release of such a "safe" video was a disappointment for Perry and expressed eagerness to her next single; while Lansky likened its "edg[iness]" to that of a "woman's antiperspirant commercial"; and the latter divided the video in what he considered to be of "good cheesy" and "bad cheesy": he highlighted the fake set, Perry's acting and the ending, but criticized the CGI, which he deemed "dopey", the product placement and Perry's "overly literal roar-off with a tiger". The only writer for the website that gave the visual a favorable review was Mike Wass, who appreciated the "campy element[s]" in it, while noting that it drew inspiration from the music video for "Doctor Jones" by the dance-pop group Aqua. In total, the reviews had an average score of approximately 6 out of 10.

James Montgomery from MTV believed that the video drew inspiration from Sheena, Queen of the Jungle and stated the video did not take itself too seriously, describing it as "camp". Slant Magazine writer Sal Cinquemani was neutral about the video, noting that although Prism was being billed as a departure for Perry, both "Roar" and its video were not. Perry was criticized by PETA for using exotic animals in the video for "Roar". Merrilee Burke from PETA stated: "Animals used for entertainment endure horrific cruelty and suffer from extreme confinement and violent training methods." Burke also declared that the animals involved in the music video were allegedly provided by a company who was criticized by US officials. Perry responded by obtaining a letter from the American Humane Association, which had representatives present at the three-day shoot. It stated that "After reviewing the reports, we believe that the Guidelines for the Safe Use of Animals in Filmed Media were followed and that no animal was harmed in the making of this music video".

On July 7, 2015, the music video for "Roar" became the fourth video to reach 1 billion views on Vevo, making Perry the first artist in history to have two music videos with over a billion views. The music video for "Roar" is the 15th most viewed YouTube video of all time, and has received over 3.5 billion views and 15 million likes as of May 2022, making her the first female artist in history to do so.

Awards and nominations

Promotion and live performances

On September 16, 2013, the song was unexpectedly used during player introductions by the Cincinnati Bengals in their home opener against the rival Pittsburgh Steelers on Monday Night Football, to tie in the song's jungle theme with the team's nickname. Throughout the game, the song was also played sporadically during game breaks. Although the Bengals won the game 20–10, the song drew much criticism by Bengals fans and even some of the team's players. One Bengals fan even told the Wall Street Journal that Steeler fans sitting near him were laughing at the Bengals fans throughout the game; the Steelers themselves have used the Styx song "Renegade" frequently at Heinz Field since 2001. Four days after the game, the team publicly apologized, announcing that while the song would not be nixed from Paul Brown Stadium's playlist completely, the team would use a hard rock or classic rock song for player introductions moving forward.

"Roar" was also used as the theme song of world number 1 tennis player Serena Williams during the 2014 US Open Championships. Williams, dressed in a matching leopard-themed dress, won the championship.

Live performances
Perry first performed "Roar" at the 2013 MTV Video Music Awards, in a specially-made boxing ring under the Brooklyn Bridge, at the end of the ceremony. She performed the song on Saturday Night Live on October 12, 2013. While hosting We Can Survive: Music for Life on October 23, 2013, she performed the song with Sara Bareilles, Bonnie McKee, Ellie Goulding, Kacey Musgraves, and duo Tegan and Sara. She also performed the song on the Australian version of The X Factor on October 28, 2013. Perry then performed the song the following day at the Sydney Opera House. She performed the song on German TV show Schlag den Raab on November 16, 2013. On December 14, 2013, Perry performed "Roar" at the NRJ Music Awards, but suffered technical difficulties which resulted in her performance being stopped by the host halfway through who asked for it to be restarted. This led many to believe that Perry had initially been lip-syncing the performance. NRJ later released an apology to Perry, stating that she had been singing live but that the wrong mix of the song was played over her live vocals, which resulted in her being visually out of sync with the backing track.

On February 1, 2015, Perry performed the song during the Super Bowl XLIX halftime show.

On July 28, 2016, she performed it at the 2016 Democratic National Convention.

On May 27, 2017, Perry performed the song as her finale at BBC radio one's big weekend in Hull.

On June 4, 2017, Perry performed "Roar" at the One Love Manchester benefit concert for the victims of the Manchester Arena bombing.

Formats and track listings

Credits and personnel
Credits adapted from Prism album liner notes.
 Katy Perry – vocals and songwriting
Bonnie McKee – songwriting
Dr. Luke – songwriting and production
Max Martin – songwriting and production
Cirkut – songwriting and production

Charts

Weekly charts

Year-end charts

Decade-end charts

Certifications and sales

See also
 List of best-selling singles in Australia
 List of best-selling singles in the United States
 List of Billboard Adult Contemporary number ones of 2013
 List of Billboard Adult Contemporary number ones of 2014
 List of Billboard Dance Club Songs number ones of 2013
 List of Billboard Hot 100 number-one singles of the 2010s

References

External links
 
 

2013 singles
2013 songs
American power pop songs
Billboard Hot 100 number-one singles
Canadian Hot 100 number-one singles
Irish Singles Chart number-one singles
Katy Perry songs
Number-one singles in Australia
Number-one singles in Austria
Number-one singles in Israel
Number-one singles in New Zealand
Number-one singles in Scotland
Song recordings produced by Cirkut (record producer)
Song recordings produced by Dr. Luke
Song recordings produced by Max Martin
Songs written by Bonnie McKee
Songs written by Cirkut (record producer)
Songs written by Dr. Luke
Songs written by Katy Perry
Songs written by Max Martin
Viral videos
UK Singles Chart number-one singles
Songs with feminist themes
Songs involved in plagiarism controversies